The 2012 West Lancashire Borough Council election took place on 3 May 2012 to elect members of  West Lancashire Borough Council in Lancashire, England. One third of the council was up for election, with results compared to the corresponding vote in 2008 West Lancashire Council election.

Ward results

Ashurst

Aughton and Downholland

Birch Green

Burscough East

Burscough West

Derby

Digmoor

Halsall

Hesketh-with-Becconsall

Knowsley

Moorside

Rufford

Scott

Skelmersdale North

Skelmersdale South

Tarleton

Up Holland

Wrightington

References

2012 English local elections
2012
2010s in Lancashire